Leather Wings is an album by Japanther. It was released by Menlo Park Recordings in 2003. The album was given 7.2 out of 10 in a review by Pitchfork Media.

Track listing 
 "Leather Wings" – 1:12
 "Buried Alive" – 2:50
 "Pleased to Meet You" – 3:16
 "Blood of the Panther" – 1:10
 "16 Stories High" – 5:27
 "Super Loser" – 4:02
 "South of Northport" – 3:59
 "TV Nightmare" – 1:13
 "Metal Bike" – 3:44
 "Lazer Shot" – 1:11
 "...Of Dogs" – 2:58
 "Dedicated" – 2:46
 untitled – 1:39

References 

Japanther albums
2003 albums